The names Red Huns,  Karmir Xyon (in Iranian) and Kermichiones (in European languages) usually refer to:

 Alchon Huns 
 Kidarites

See also
Hephthalites
Huna people
Huns
White Huns
Xionites